Codex Mutinensis designated by Ha or 014 (in the Gregory-Aland numbering), α 6 (von Soden), is a Greek uncial manuscript of the Acts of Apostles, dated paleographically to the 9th century. The codex contains 43 parchment leaves (33 cm by 23 cm).

Description 
The codex contains the book of Acts, with major lacunae (Acts 1:1-5:28, 9:39-10:19, 13:36-14:3, 27:4-28:31). The first three lacunae have been supplied by a later minuscule hand, the fourth by an uncial hand. The text measures . It is marked with breathings and accents, and is written in a single column, with 30 lines per page.  Each line is 36 letters long.  The uncial letters lean to the right.

The General epistles and Pauline epistles, were written later in minuscule hand, and now it designated as 2125.

The Greek text of this codex is a representative of the Byzantine text-type. Aland placed it in Category V.

History 

The manuscript was examined by Scholz, who collated it loosely. It was collated again by Tischendorf in 1843 and Tregelles in 1846. In 1850 Tischenforf and Tregelles compared their collations for mutual correction.

According to Burgon: "In my judgement... scarcely later".

The codex is located, in the Biblioteca Estense (Gr. 196) in Modena.

See also 

 List of New Testament uncials
 Textual criticism

References

Further reading 

 Constantin von Tischendorf, Monumenta sacra inedita I (Leipzig, 1855), pp. 37–44.

External links 
 Codex Mutinensis Ha (014): at the Encyclopedia of Textual Criticism.

Greek New Testament uncials
9th-century biblical manuscripts
Biblioteca Estense